Defending champions Peter Fleming and John McEnroe successfully defended their title, defeating Wojtek Fibak and Tom Okker in a rematch of the previous year's final, 6–3, 7–6, 6–1 to win the doubles tennis title at the 1979 Masters Grand Prix.

Knockout stage

Draw

References
1979 Masters-Doubles

Doubles